Clara Virginia Fields better known as C. Virginia Fields (née Clark; born August 6, 1945) is an American activist who served as Borough President of Manhattan. She was elected in 1997 and reelected in 2001, with her second term expiring at the end of 2005.

Early life and education

Clara Virginia Clark was born in Birmingham, Alabama to Peter and Lucille Clark. She received a B.A. in sociology from Knoxville College in Tennessee in 1967 and an M.S.W. from Indiana University Bloomington in 1969. She married Henry Fields in 1971; they divorced in 1985. In 1971, she moved to New York City and became a social worker. In the late 1970s and 1980s she worked in a variety of administrative positions in the social services field, while also becoming involved in community politics.

Fields was known for her activism during the height of the civil rights movement in which she participated in a number of protests and marches, thus beginning her foray into social and political advocacy. She is a member of Alpha Kappa Alpha.

Political career

In 1989, Fields was elected to the New York City Council. In 1997, Fields was elected Manhattan Borough President, replacing Ruth Messinger who ran for Mayor, unsuccessfully, against Rudy Giuliani.  Fields received acclaim for her support of cultural organizations such as the New York Shakespeare Festival and the West Side Arts Coalition. She was in office during the September 11, 2001 attacks.

Some community groups throughout Manhattan, however, have a low opinion of Ms. Fields' record. They argue that she would not listen to community concerns regarding the noisy nightclubs and promoted outsized and ill-advised development projects.  In 1999, Fields supported using eminent domain to seize a family-owned manufacturing plant in Harlem to be replaced by a Costco store.

In 2005, Fields was a Democratic candidate for mayor of New York City.  In early polls, she placed second to Fernando Ferrer.  She suffered criticism for her campaign's perceived lack of policy-based motivation, with some critics pointing to the term limits of her position at the time as the real impetus for her campaign.  A small scandal emerged when it was discovered that her campaign literature included photographs doctored to create the impression of diversity in support.  Fields never found traction and in the primary she finished third with 15.92% of the vote. Fields finished behind former Bronx Borough President Fernando Ferrer and Congressman Anthony Weiner, but ahead of City Council Speaker Gifford Miller.

In March 2006 it was reported that Fields would run for the State Senate seat representing Harlem and parts of Upper Manhattan, being vacated by Senate Minority Leader David Paterson.  Paterson decided not to seek reelection to the Senate seat in order to run for lieutenant governor on a ticket with State Attorney General Eliot Spitzer. On June 1, 2006, Fields announced that she was ending her Senate campaign, explaining that it was not the right time for her to run.

Post-political career
Fields has been the President and CEO of the non-profit organization, National Black Leadership Commission on AIDS (NBLC), since 2008.

See also
Government of New York City

Bibliography
Paterson, David Black, Blind, & In Charge: A Story of Visionary Leadership and Overcoming Adversity. New York, New York, 2020
John C. Walker,The Harlem Fox: J. Raymond Jones at Tammany 1920:1970, New York: State University  New York Press, 1989.
David N. Dinkins, A Mayor's Life: Governing New York's Gorgeous Mosaic, PublicAffairs Books, 2013
Rangel, Charles B.; Wynter, Leon (2007). And I Haven't Had a Bad Day Since: From the Streets of Harlem to the Halls of Congress. New York: St. Martin's Press.
Baker Motley, Constance Equal Justice Under The Law: An Autobiography, New York: Farrar, Straus, and Giroux, 1998.
Howell, Ron Boss of Black Brooklyn: The Life and Times of Bertram L. Baker  Fordham University Press Bronx, New York 2018
Jack, Hulan Fifty Years a Democrat:The Autobiography of Hulan Jack New Benjamin Franklin House New York, NY 1983
Clayton-Powell, Adam Adam by Adam:The Autobiography of Adam Clayton Powell Jr. New York, New York 1972
Pritchett, Wendell E. Robert Clifton Weaver and the American City: The Life and Times of an Urban Reformer Chicago: University of Chicago Press 2008
Davis, Benjamin Communist Councilman from Harlem:Autobiographical Notes Written in a Federal Penitentiary New York, New York 1969

References

1945 births
Living people
African-American New York City Council members
African-American women in politics
Manhattan borough presidents
New York City Council members
New York (state) Democrats
2004 United States presidential electors
Politicians from Birmingham, Alabama
Knoxville College alumni
Indiana University Bloomington alumni
21st-century American women politicians
21st-century American politicians
20th-century American women politicians
20th-century American politicians
Women New York City Council members
20th-century African-American women
20th-century African-American politicians
21st-century African-American women
21st-century African-American politicians